is a Japanese manga artist whose works include Udauda Yatteru Hima wa Nei and Full Ahead! Coco. Most of his works were featured in Akita Shoten's Weekly Shōnen Champion magazine and published by Shonen Champion Comics.

Works

References

External links
 

1967 births
Living people
Manga artists from Tokyo
People from Tokyo